Albert Malaspina (1160/1165–1206/1212), called Alberto Moro ("the Moor") and lo marches putanier ("the whoring marquess"), was a member of the illustrious Malaspina family. He was a noted troubadour and patron of troubadours. Albert disputes with Peire de la Caravana the position of earliest native Italian troubadour.

He was a son of Obizzo I the Great and husband of a daughter of William V of Montferrat. His brother-in-law Boniface I of Montferrat and his nephews Corrado (Conrad) and Guglielmo (William) were all enthusiastic patrons of troubadours. He was renowned for his bravery, generosity, courtliness, and learning. He composed a tenso with Raimbaut de Vaqueiras that begins Ara'm digatz Raimbaut, si vos agrada. Though this is the only work of his to survive, the author of his vida compliments his couplets, cansos, and sirventes.

According to Raimbaut, in his famous "epic letter" Valen marques, senher de Monferrat, in the 1170s Albert abducted Saldina de Mar, a daughter of a prominent Genoese family only to have her rescued by Boniface of Montferrat and restored her to her lover, Ponset d'Aguilar.

Albert's wife was possibly the trobairitz known only as Ysabella.

External links

Ara'm digatz senher Raimbauz, si vos agrada at Trobar.org (translated)
La corte dei marchesi Malaspina

Sources

The Vidas of the Troubadours. Margarita Egan, trans. New York: Garland, 1984. .

1160s births
1206 deaths
12th-century Italian troubadours
13th-century Italian troubadours
Malaspina family